Sojourn is an album by pianist Mickey Tucker which was recorded in 1977 and released on the Xanadu label.

Reception

The Allmusic review awarded the album 2 stars.

Track listing 
All compositions by Mickey Tucker
 "Fast Train to Zurich" - 7:01  
 "Norwegian Nights-Norwegian Days" - 7:28  
 "Tunisian Festival" - 8:09  
 "The Silent Mind of Fraulein Stein" - 8:58  
 "French Fables" - 4:22  
 "Dusseldorf Dance" - 9:35

Personnel 
Mickey Tucker - piano
Bill Hardman - trumpet
Junior Cook - tenor saxophone
Ronnie Cuber - baritone saxophone
Cecil McBee - bass
Eddie Gladden - drums

References 

Mickey Tucker albums
1977 albums
Xanadu Records albums
Albums produced by Don Schlitten